Turks in Poland are people of Turkish ethnicity living in Poland who form one of the country's smaller minority groups.

Demographics 
There is little coherent statistical data regarding their numbers. The majority of these Turks live in Warsaw and Łódź but there are also Turkish communities in Gdańsk, Poznań, Kraków, and Wrocław, and students in small cities like Lublin or Krosno.

Many Turks in Poland are entrepreneurs and investors.

Naturalization

Notable people 
, film director and screenwriter (Turkish father)
, graphic artist (Turkish father)
Maria Aurora of Spiegel, Ottoman Turkish mistress of Augustus II the Strong 
children:
Frederick Augustus Rutowsky, commanded Saxon forces in the Siege of Pirna (Turkish mother) 
Maria Anna Katharina Rutowska, noblewoman (Turkish mother)
Teuvo Tulio, film director (Turkish-Polish father)

Bibliography 
 
 .
 .
 .

See also 
 Poland–Turkey relations 
 Turks in Europe

References

Islam in Poland
Muslim communities in Europe
Poland
Poland
Ethnic groups in Poland